"Please Don't Fall in Love" is a song by Cliff Richard and released as a single in November 1983 in the UK. The song is written by Mike Batt. It was the second single released in the UK from Richard's 25th Anniversary studio album Silver. It reached number 7 in the UK Singles Chart and earned a Silver disc for sales over 250,000.

In some markets such as Germany, Australia and The Netherlands, the song was the third single lifted from the Silver album.

Chart performance

References

1983 songs
1983 singles
Cliff Richard songs
EMI Records singles
Songs written by Mike Batt